The 2011 Nigerian Senate election in Bauchi State was held on April 11, 2011, to elect members of the Nigerian Senate to represent Bauchi State. Abdul Ahmed Ningi representing Bauchi Central, Adamu Gumba Ibrahim representing Bauchi South and. Babayo Garba Gamawa representing Bauchi North all won on the platform of People's Democratic Party.

Overview

Summary

Results

Bauchi Central 
People's Democratic Party candidate Ahmed Ningi won the election, defeating Action Congress of Nigeria candidate Isah Hamma Misau and other party candidates.

Bauchi South 
People's Democratic Party candidate Ibrahim Adamu Gumba won the election, defeating other party candidates.

Bauchi North 
People's Democratic Party candidate Babayo Garba Gamawa won the election, defeating Action Congress of Nigeria candidate Faruq Mustapha and other party candidates.

References 

April 2011 events in Nigeria